Wally Freeman is the name of

 Wally Freeman (athlete) (1893–1997), British long-distance runner
 Wally Freeman (rugby league), Australian rugby league player